Grupo Desportivo Estoril Praia, commonly known as Estoril, is a Portuguese sports club from Estoril, Cascais, Lisboa Region.

Current squad

References

External links
 

Women's football clubs in Portugal
G.D. Estoril Praia
Sport in Estoril
Campeonato Nacional de Futebol Feminino teams